Mary Christine Carpenter  (born 7 December 1946) is an English historian who serves as professor of medieval English history at the University of Cambridge.

Early life and education
Carpenter was born on 7 December 1946 in Oxford, England. She received her Bachelor of Arts and Doctor of Philosophy degrees from Newnham College, Cambridge. Her doctoral thesis was titled "Political society in Warwickshire, c.1401-72" and was submitted in 1976.

Academia

Carpenter was a freelance tutor and lecturer at the University of Cambridge from 1976 to 1979. In 1979, she was elected a fellow of New Hall, Cambridge. She was additionally a university assistant lecturer from 1983 to 1988 and a university lecturer from 1988 to 1995. She was appointed Reader in Medieval English History in 1995 and made Professor of Medieval English History in 2005.

Carpenter is author and editor of a number of English history books and papers. Her research interests focus on the political and constitutional history of England from 1066 to  1500, and in the political, social, economic, religious and cultural history of noble and gentry landowners in that period.

Carpenter supervises postgraduate work on government, politics and landed society from c. 1250 to 1500 and at the undergraduate level she teaches all aspects of English history from c. 1050 to 1500.

Carpenter is the director of an Arts and Humanities Research Council-funded project to complete the calendaring of the 15th-century Inquisitions post mortem, and one of the editors of the Cambridge University Press Studies in Medieval Life and Thought, in addition to serving on other editorial committees.

In June 2012, Carpenter was selected to give the Ford Lectures at the University of Oxford in the 2015–2016 academic year.

Books and other works

 Locality and Polity: A Study of Warwickshire Landed Society 1401–1499 (1992) (winner of the Royal Historical Society's Whitfield Prize for 1992)
 Updated version of Kingsford's edition of The Stonor Letters and Papers 1290–1483 (1996)
 The Wars of the Roses: Politics and the Constitution c. 1437–1509 (1997)
 The Armburgh Papers (1998), an edition of the largest collection of 15th-century gentry letters discovered since the 19th century
 Political Culture in Late Medieval Britain (2004), as co-editor with Linda Clark and author of the introduction
 A New Constitutional History of Late-Medieval England, 1215–1509, in preparation.
 Wisdom and Chivalry: Chaucer's Knight's Tale and Medieval Political Theory (2008) by S. H. Rigby. Reviewer: Professor Christine Carpenter, University of Cambridge.

Honours and awards
 Fellow of the Royal Historical Society (FRHistS), 1982
 Faculty of History representative for The Prince's Teaching Institute
 Royal Historical Society Whitfield Prize, 1992
 Associate editor, Oxford Dictionary of National Biography, 1994–2002
 James Ford Special Lecturer, University of Oxford, 1996
 Guest lecturer, Moscow State University, 2006
 Co-editor, Cambridge University Press Studies in Medieval Life and Thought
 Member, editorial board, The Fifteenth Century
 Member, Medieval Sources Advisory Panel, The National Archives
 Member, board of directors, Anglo-American Legal Tradition (AALT) 
 Member, Arts and Humanities Research Council Review Panel
 British Academy/Leverhulme Trust senior research fellow, 2002–2003
 Arts and Humanities Research Council major research grants, 1999–2008
 Member, council of governors, Francis Holland Schools
 Professorial fellow, New Hall, 2005–2008

See also
 Faculty of History, University of Cambridge

References

External links
 University of Cambridge Faculty of History, Professor Christine Carpenter
 BBC Radio 4 - The Tudor State with ... "Christine Carpenter, Fellow in History at New Hall, Cambridge."
 Institute of Historical Research - History On-line

1946 births
20th-century English historians
21st-century English historians
Alumni of Newnham College, Cambridge
British medievalists
British women historians
Fellows of New Hall, Cambridge
Fellows of the Royal Historical Society
Historians of England
Living people
Members of the University of Cambridge faculty of history
Women medievalists